Lozon is a former municipality in Normandy, France.

Lozon may also refer to:
 , a river in Normandy, France, part of the Douve system
Jeffrey Lozon, Canadian health executive

See also
 
Lauzon (disambiguation)
Luzon, the largest island in the Philippines